Paraplegin is a protein that in humans is encoded by the SPG7 gene located on chromosome 16.

Structure 

The SPG7 gene contains 21 exons and encodes for a protein that is approximately 88 kDa in size. Two transcript variants encoding distinct isoforms have been identified for this gene. 

The structure of the SPG7 resolved by X-ray crystallography reveals that the protein functions as a hexamer and is structurally most similar to bacterial FtSH proteases. It contains an FtsH-homology protease domain as well as an AAA+ homology ATPase domain. The protein is thought to use ATPase-driven conformational changes to the AAA-domain in order to deliver the substrate peptides to be degraded to its protease core.

Function  

The SPG7 protein is a nuclear-encoded metalloprotease protein that is a member of the AAA protein family. Members of this protein family share an ATPase domain and have roles in diverse cellular processes including membrane trafficking, intracellular motility, organelle biogenesis, protein folding, and proteolysis. The SPG7 protein is a transmembrane protein that is located to the inner mitochondrial membrane, and is part of the m-AAA metalloproteinase complex, which constitutes one of the known intra-mitochondrial proteases that function in mitochondrial protein quality control.

Interactions 

SPG7 interacts with AFG like AAA ATPase 2 (AFG3L2) on the mitochondrial inner membrane to form the m-AAA metalloproteinase complex.

Clinical significance 

Mutations associated with this gene cause autosomal recessive spastic paraplegia 7, a neurodegenerative disorder that is characterized by a slow, gradual, progressive weakness and spasticity of the lower limbs. SPG7 mutations have also been associated with other undiagnosed ataxia.

In model animals, knockdown of spastic paraplegia 7 by siRNA inhibits the early stages of HIV-1 replication in 293T cells infected with VSV-G pseudotyped HIV-1. It has been shown that an SPG7 variant escapes phosphorylation-regulated processing by AFG3L2 and increases mitochondrial reactive oxygen species generation and is correlated with many clinical phenotypes. Furthermore, SPG7 deficiency is associated with abnormal mitochondrial DNA maintenance, which may lead to secondary mitochondrial DNA lesions and impaired respiratory activities and mitochondrial functions.

References

Further reading

External links 
  GeneReviews/NCBI/NIH/UW entry on Spastic Paraplegia 7